In mathematics, the Fox H-function H(x) is a generalization of the Meijer G-function and the Fox–Wright function introduced by .
It is defined by a Mellin–Barnes integral

where L is a certain contour separating the poles of the two factors in the numerator.

Relation to other Functions

Lambert W-function 
A relation of the Fox H-Function to the -1 branch of the Lambert W-function is given by

Meijer G-function 
Compare to the Meijer G-function

The special case for which the Fox H reduces to the Meijer G is Aj = Bk = C, C > 0 for j = 1...p and k = 1...q :

A generalization of the Fox H-function is given by  Ram Kishore Saxena Innayat Hussain . For a further generalization of this function, useful in physics and statistics was given by A.M.Mathai and Ram Kishore Saxena, see .

References

.

External links
 hypergeom on GitLab
 Use in solving  on MathOverflow

Hypergeometric functions
Special functions